Jay Michael Blankenau (born 27 September 1989) is a Canadian professional volleyball player. A member of the Canada national team, and a participant at the Olympic Games (Rio 2016, Tokyo 2020).

Personal life
Jay Blankenau was born in Edmonton to Shannon Schurman and Mike Blankenau. He attended both, Mount Royal University, and the University of Calgary, as well as played for both respective teams.

Career
Blankenau began his post–school volleyball career training at the Team Canada Full Time Training Center in Gatineau. He spent the 2012/13 and 2014/15 season there, spending a season at Greek club MAS Niki Aiginio in between. In 2015, he signed a contract with Dutch club Abiant Lycurgus, helping them win the championship. For the 2016/17 season, he joined SWD Powervolleys Düren in Germany.

National team
Blankenau joined the senior national team in 2014. He was a member of the Canadian national team that finished 5th at the 2016 Summer Olympics. In June 2021, Blankenau was named to the Canada's 2020 Olympic team.

Honours

Clubs
 National championships
 2015/2016  Dutch Supercup, with Abiant Lycurgus Groningen
 2015/2016  Dutch Cup, with Abiant Lycurgus Groningen
 2015/2016   Dutch Championship, with Abiant Lycurgus Groningen
 2017/2018   Belgian Championship, with Noliko Maaseik
 2018/2019   Belgian Championship, with Noliko Maaseik

References

External links

 
 
 Player profile at Volleybox.net 
 Player profile at PlusLiga.pl 

1989 births
Living people
Sportspeople from Edmonton
Canadian men's volleyball players
Olympic volleyball players of Canada
Volleyball players at the 2016 Summer Olympics
Volleyball players at the 2020 Summer Olympics
Canadian expatriate sportspeople in Greece
Expatriate volleyball players in Greece
Canadian expatriate sportspeople in the Netherlands
Expatriate volleyball players in the Netherlands
Canadian expatriate sportspeople in Germany
Expatriate volleyball players in Germany
Canadian expatriate sportspeople in Belgium
Expatriate volleyball players in Belgium
Canadian expatriate sportspeople in Turkey
Expatriate volleyball players in Turkey
Canadian expatriate sportspeople in Poland
Expatriate volleyball players in Poland
Projekt Warsaw players
Setters (volleyball)